Zuid-Holland Oost (literally East South Holland) is an official region of the province of South Holland in the Netherlands.

The region consists of the following subregions:
 Alblasserwaard-Vijfheerenlanden, municipalities: Gorinchem, Hardinxveld-Giessendam, and Molenlanden.
 Gouwestreek, municipalities: Bodegraven-Reeuwijk, Gouda, Waddinxveen, Zuidplas, and Boskoop (former municipality)
 Krimpenerwaard (region), municipality: Krimpenerwaard
 Rijnstreek, municipalities: Alphen aan den Rijn (incl. Rijnwoude), Nieuwkoop, and Jacobswoude (former municipality)

See also 
 Rijnmond
 Zuid-Holland West
 Zuid-Holland Zuid

Notes

References 
  Zuid-Holland Oost, Province of South Holland

Regions of the Netherlands
Regions of South Holland